"Flute" is a song by Australian electronic DJ and record production duo New World Sound and Dutch DJ and Record producer Thomas Newson. The song was released in Australia as a digital download in November 25, 2013 through Doorn Records, Spinnin Records and Ministry of Sound Australia. The song was written and produced by New World Sound and Thomas Newson. The song charted in Belgium, France, Netherlands and Switzerland.

Music video
A music video to accompany the release of "Flute" was first released onto YouTube on November 21, 2013 at a total length of three minutes and twenty-nine seconds.

Track listing

Chart performance

Weekly charts

Year-end charts

Release history

Flutes

New World Sound and Thomas Newson released a second version of the song titled "Flutes" featuring guest vocals from British Grime artist Lethal Bizzle. It was released as a digital download on December 21, 2014.

Music video
A music video to accompany the release of "Flutes" was first released onto YouTube on September 30, 2014 at a total length of three minutes.

Track listing

Weekly charts

Release history

References

Songs about musical instruments
2014 songs
2014 singles